The Magnolia Petroleum Company Filling Station is a historic automotive service station building at Larch and 1st Streets in Kingsland, Arkansas.  It is a small single-story masonry building, built of red and buff brick and covered by a gabled roof.  The front facade has a door on the left side and a plate glass window (now boarded up) on the right.  A concrete pad in front of the building originally supported the fuel pumps.  The building was built about 1930, and is a good example of an early filling station with Tudor and Craftsman features, built to a Magnolia Company design which was used for at least one other filling station, in North Little Rock (which was destroyed after a fire in 2018).

The building was listed on the National Register of Historic Places in 2019.

A similarly named filling station in Fayetteville, Arkansas, in northwest Arkansas, was listed on the National Register in 1978 as the Magnolia Company Filling Station.

See also
List of historic filling stations in the United States
National Register of Historic Places listings in Cleveland County, Arkansas

References

Gas stations on the National Register of Historic Places in Arkansas
Buildings and structures completed in 1930
Buildings and structures in Cleveland County, Arkansas
National Register of Historic Places in Cleveland County, Arkansas